Kamionki Duże  is a village in the administrative district of Gmina Łysomice, within Toruń County, Kuyavian-Pomeranian Voivodeship, in north-central Poland.

It is the seventh largest town in the Łysomice commune.

References

Villages in Toruń County